Mikhail Petrovich Tarasov (1899 – 1970) was a Soviet statesman and politician.

Biography 
He "Followed in his father's footsteps", from the age of 12, began his career on the Nikolayevskaya railway, in 1911. He volunteered for military service of the Red Army, since 1918. Member of the Communist Party since 1924.

In 1925-1944, he worked in trade union and party work. Since the beginning of the Great Patriotic War, he led the evacuation of the population and enterprises of the Ukrainian SSR to the rear of the Union. In 1944-1950 he was a member of the Presidium and Secretary of the All-Union Central Council of Trade Unions. At the same time since 1945, a member of the General Council and Executive Committee of the World Federation of Trade Unions.

From June 1947 to March 1951 — Chairman of the Supreme Soviet of the RSFSR.

From July 1950 to April 1959 — Chairman of the Presidium of the Supreme Soviet of the RSFSR, Deputy Chairman of the Presidium of the Supreme Soviet of the USSR.

In 1959-1970 — Adviser to the Council of Ministers of the RSFSR.

In 1952-1956 — member of the Central Auditing Commission. In 1956-1961 — candidate for membership in the Central Committee of the CPSU.

In 1950-1962 — Deputy of the Supreme Soviet of the USSR.

Writings 

 The concern of the Party and the Government about the rise of the material well-being and cultural level of workers [Text] / M. Tarasov. — Moscow: ed. and 1st type. Profizdata, 1950, printing house "Red Proletarian".

Literature 

 Resolution of the 1st session of the Supreme Soviet of the RSFSR of the II convocation, June 20–26, 1947, verbatim report. M., 1947.
 Resolution of the 1st session of the Supreme Soviet of the RSFSR of the III convocation on April 13 — 17, 1951, verbatim report. M., 1951.
 Resolution of the 4th session of the Supreme Soviet of the RSFSR of the II convocation of July 4–7, 1950, verbatim report. M., 1950.
 Ogonyok magazine No. 26 (1203) dated June 25, 1950.
 The Great Soviet Encyclopedia. 2nd edition. Vol. 41. M., 1956.
 Resolution of the I-th session of the Supreme Soviet of the RSFSR of the V convocation on April 15 — 16, 1959, verbatim report. M., 1959.

References 

1899 births
1970 deaths
Date of birth missing
Date of death missing
People from Moskovsky Uyezd
Central Committee of the Communist Party of the Soviet Union candidate members
Heads of state of the Russian Soviet Federative Socialist Republic
Third convocation members of the Supreme Soviet of the Soviet Union
Fourth convocation members of the Supreme Soviet of the Soviet Union
Fifth convocation members of the Supreme Soviet of the Soviet Union
Recipients of the Order of Lenin
Recipients of the Order of the Red Banner of Labour